Ruch-e Sofla may refer to:
 Ruch-e Sofla, Kohgiluyeh and Boyer-Ahmad
 Ruch-e Sofla, Qazvin